The Chin people are an ethnic group native to the Chin State of Myanmar, and India's northeast states.  Strictly speaking, the term "Chin" only affects to the 53 sub-tribes of the Chin ethnic group, divided and recognized by the Burmese government. They speak the Kuki-Chin–Naga languages, which is often unintelligible to the others but are connected strongly.

The Chin are one of the founding groups of the Union of Burma, along with the Shan, Kachin, and Burmese. The Chin speak a variety of related languages, share elements of cultures and traditions. According to the British state media BBC News, "The Chin people... are one of the most persecuted minority groups in Burma." These people predominantly live in the Chin State, Bago Division, Ayeyarwady Division, Magwe Division, Rakhine State and Sagaing Region of Myanmar, but are also spread throughout Burma, Bangladesh and India. In the 2014 Burmese ethnic census, the Chin ethnicity was again dismissed by the people of the Chin State. 

During the era of British rule, the colonial government used the compound term 'Chin-Kuki-Mizo' to group the Kukish language speaking people, and the Indian government inherited this nomenclature. Some Chin nationalists now consider that Chin would mean subtle Paite domination of Chin, Kuki and Chin identity, which other groups like Hmars, Chins (Chinmi), and Koms may not use.

Etymology 
The term 'Chin' initially as used by the Burmese in Myanmar referred to all the hill tribes in the western frontier of Myanmar. However, in India the hill tribes are divided into two groups i.e. Chin-Kuki and Naga. The Kukis generally live to the south of the Nagas.

The term now generally refer only to the majority Chin-Kuki-Mizo speaking communities of Myanmar since many of the similar tribes have rejected the name as foreign.

Alternatively, the Chin-Kuki-Mizo use the original name of the people ‘Chinlung/Khul/Sinlung’. It goes by different pronunciations through the respective languages’ evolution to Yaw, Jou, Zou, Cho, Qin, Zy etc.

History and politics 
The Chin people are believed to have come to Burma via the Chindwin Valley in the late ninth or tenth century A.D.  They moved westward, and are thought to have settled in the present Chin State around 1300-1400. The Chin practice oral traditions and do not have written historical records.

The British first conquered Burma in 1824, established rule in 1886, and remained in power until Burma's independence in 1948. The 1896 'Pakokku Chin Hills Regulation Act' stated that the British would govern the Chins separately from the rest of Burma, which allowed for traditional Chin chiefs to remain in power while Britain was still allotted power via indirect rule (Human Rights Watch, 2009). Burma's independence from Britain in 1948 coincided with the Chin people adopting a democratic government rather than continuing its traditional rule of chiefs. The government did not allow the celebration Chin National Day. Instead of Chin National Day, Chin State Day is celebrated on February 20, the day that marked the transition from traditional to democratic rule in the Chin State (Center for Applied Linguistics, 2007).

The newfound democracy of Chin State ended abruptly in 1962 with the onset of the military rule of General Ne Win in Burma (Center for Applied Linguistics, 2007). Ne Win remained in power until 1988, when nationwide protests against military rule erupted. These uprisings, commonly known as the 8888 because of the date on which they occurred, were met by an outburst of violence from the military government. The violent government response killed approximately 3,000 people in just a matter of weeks and imprisoned many more (Human Rights Watch, 2009). It was during this period of resistance to military rule that the Chin National Front (CNF) and its armed branch, the Chin National Army (CNA), gained momentum (Human Rights Watch, 2009). In 2012, the Chin National Army organized a ceasefire with the Burma military. In 2015, the Chin National Army (CNA) signed a National Ceasefire Agreement (NCA).

Divisions

Tribes
There are many tribes among the Chin people, such as the Zomi, Lai, Zanniat, Yaw, Yindu, Senthang, Ngawn, Mizo, Zotung, Daai, Thadou (Kuki), Khami Mro-Khimi (Wakung), Matu, Hmar, Asho, Cho, Mara. The word "Chin" comes from “Chinlung”, which is believed to be a cave, where their ancestors once lived. A Chin scholar, Lian Uk in 1968, define the term “Chin” and similar names as “people”, further stating that the name “Chinland” means Ourland. Chin people are scattered between three countries, namely India, Burma (Myanmar) and Bangladesh. In India, the Chin people live in the state of Mizoram and a sizable population of Chin live in Churachandpur district of Manipur, consisting of smaller tribes such as the Hmar, Paite, and others. The Bawm tribe in southern Mizoram State and Bangladesh is a sub-group Lai tribe. Some of the Chin live in Rakhine State and most of them are Cumtu, Asho, Kongtu and Laitu. They are living in Myebon, Minbya, Ann, Thandwe and Gwa. Among them, the majority is Cumtu Chin. The Chin speak several languages, Kukish, Naga and Maraic languages; Ethnologue lists 49 languages in this group, of which 20 contain the word "Chin" in their name.

Present-day ethnic groups

There are several tribes within Chin people. For example: Cumtu, Zomi, [|Matu]], Mara, Yaw, Asho, Cho, Kuki, Daa Yindu People(Yindu Chin), Laimi, Mizo, Zotung and Khumi. Each Tribe has hundreds of clans and family tree. Although the word "Chin" is absent among the Chin language, it is found to be used by these people since the 8th century. Therefore, the majority of people living in Chin State accepted the name "Chin".

Attempts at unification

The realization that the Zomi are one group that share common dialectical roots and customs despite separation by international and state boundaries, brought about movements for unification of the occupied territories and of the people. One of the first movements was the Mizo National Movement which ended with the formation of the Mizoram State in India.
 The re-unification of the Chin-Kuki-Mizo people in the Chin Hills, Manipur Hills, Biate Hills, Hmar Hills, Riam Hills, Rakhaing Hills, Lakher Hills, Yaw plains, Lushai Hill, Chindwin plains and the Chittagong Hill area arouse in 1990 with the Zomi Revolutionary Army. It is an armed group in Manipur, India.

Culture

Chin National Day
The Chin National Day is celebrated annually on February 20, which is the day the Chin people abolished the slavery system or chieftainship. The first Chin National Day was celebrated in 1951 at Mindat.  People display many traditional dance such as bamboo dance, Sarlam (conquest dance), Khuangcawi(a lady is lifted by a crowd), Ruakhatlak/Cherua and many other dances from each group. One of the big events on Chin National Day is the traditional wrestling (Lai Paih).  There is also Miss competition from each town or city in Chin State. Other events, such as fashion shows and singing also take place in Chin National Day.  Traditional food, such as Sabuti/Sabaktui ( hominy corn soup) and Chang (rice cake) are served.

Clothing
There are several tradition dresses such as Matu, Falam, Tedim, Zo, Tapong, Zotung, Mindat, Daa Yindu(Kanpetlet), Mara, etc. The main colors use for these traditional dresses are red, green and black. Accessories such as bracelets, necklaces, hairpins and rings also play a huge role when it comes to traditional clothing as they complete the overall looks of the Chin. Chin people do not wear these clothes in daily life. They wear these on special occasions like Sundays, weddings, Chin National Day and any other important occasions

Sports
Wrestling is a part of the Chin people's tradition.

Chin United F.C. represents the Chin people in Burmese association football. The club play in the Myanmar National League.

Language

There are 31 different varieties of the Chin language, which are also spoken in India and Bangladesh. The largest varieties in three countries are:
 Mizo Chin along with Lusei, Hualngo, Hmar estimated 1,000,000+
 Zomi Tedim Chin with an estimated 344,000 speakers
 Thadou Kuki Chin estimated 300,000
 Asho Chin 200,000-300,000
 Falam Chin with an estimated 50,300 speakers
 Haka Chin (Hakha) with an estimated 125,000 speakers
 Matu Chin 25,000 speakers
 Khumi Chin 90,000
 Mara Chin with an estimated 50,000 speakers
 Cho Chin 60,000
 Zotung Chin 35,000

There are also many different accents among the same dialects. Many Chin people, especially students also speak Burmese, since it is the primary official language in Myanmar and it is taught in school.

Religion
Traditionally, the Chin peoples were animists. However, in the late 1800s, the first Christian missionaries arrived in the Chin State, and began sharing the message of Christianity with indigenous people.  Due to the work of the Baptist Arthur E. Carson, their efforts were successful, and today the majority of Chin are Christians, with most belonging to Protestant denominations, especially Baptist. Many Chin people have served as evangelists and pastors, ministering in places such as the United States, Australia, Guam, and India.

The Chin people's adoption of Christianity was not followed by the rest of Burma, and, since independence, the military government has persecuted the Chin people on religious grounds.

Christianity grew from 35% in 1966 to 90% in 2010.

Since the late 20th century, a group of Chin, Kuki, and Mizo peoples claim descent from Bnei Menashe, one of the Lost Tribes of Israel and have adopted the practice of Judaism.

Human rights violations against Chin peoples
The Chin people in Myanmar are one of the minority ethnic groups that have suffered widespread and ongoing ethnic and religious persecution ever since General Ne Win overthrew the democratically elected government in 1962. The predominant religion in Myanmar is Buddhism, however, the Chin people are largely Christian due to American missionary work in the 19th and 20th century. This has led to continuous attempts at forced assimilation. There have been recorded numerous crimes against humanity in Myanmar's western Chin state, committed mainly by the Tatmadaw (members of the Burmese Army) and police; however, other agents of the military government and the State Peace and Development Council (SPDC) are also involved. Despite continued persecution, little has been done on the part of the Chin people to speak out due to fear of reprisal, restrictions on travel, and the press imposed by the Burmese military regime. In their oppression of the Chin people, the Tatmadaw consistently violate the rule of law. The Chin people have been subject to forced labor, torture, arbitrary arrests, unlawful detention, and extrajudicial killings.  Such treatment has incited a mass exodus of refugees who have left to neighboring nations such as India, Thailand, and Malaysia, even though doing so will risk further torture, detention, or even death.  India is the most common destination for Chin refugees, given its close proximity, yet Mizoram (the state in India with the largest Chin population) does not give them full refugee protection and they have no legal status there.

Extrajudicial killings
The right to life is a non-derogable (not revocable under any circumstances), as outlined in the Universal Declaration of Human Rights (UDHR) and the International Covenant on Civil and Political Rights (ICCPR). The articles in the ICCPR are binding on member states that have ratified the ICCPR, however, Myanmar is one of few states that have neither signed nor ratified it. Article 3 of the UDHR states that everyone has the right to life, liberty and security of a person and article 6 of the ICCPR states that every human being has the inherent right to life and no one shall be arbitrarily deprived of his or her life. Myanmar has also ratified the Convention on the Rights of the Child (CRC) and article 6 states that parties to the Convention must recognize that every child has the inherent right to life. Despite these international instruments prohibiting extrajudicial killings, they still occur to the Chins in Myanmar.

Extrajudicial killings are committed by the SPDC and the Tatmadaw in Chin state, and the killers are never brought to justice. Human Rights Watch (HRW) has conducted several interviews with Chins who have fled Myanmar to produce a full report outlining the types of persecution that they face. In an interview with HRW, a Chin pastor described an incident that he witnessed in 2006 in Falam township. He stated that the SPDC was searching for members of the opposing Chin National Army (CNA) throughout the entire town, but when no information was given, they beat the village council headman and ultimately shot him dead. The Chin Human Rights Organization (CHRO) documented that between 2005 and 2007, sixteen extrajudicial killings occurred with four of them being children. Also between 2006 and 2010, seven Chin men were killed because they were suspected of supporting the CNA and four Chin women were raped before being murdered.

Arbitrary arrests, detention and attacks
Under section 61 of the Myanmar Code of Criminal Procedure 1898, a person who is arrested without a warrant must not be detained for more than twenty-four hours. Section 340 states a person who has proceedings against him or her has the right to legal representation. Also, article 9 of the UDHR states that no one shall be subjected to arbitrary arrest, detention, or exile. Despite the presence of legal structures and international law, the rule of law is not followed in Myanmar and arbitrary arrests, detention, and attacks are still carried out by the Tatmadaw and SPDC.

A number of Chins who were interviewed by Human Rights Watch describe the abuses in detail. One Chin man recalls back to the year 2000 when he was 16 years old. He was approached by the Burmese police and Tatmadaw who were accusing him of being connected to the CNA, even though he told them he was not and had never even contacted anyone from the CNA or other opposition groups before. The police and Tatmadaw refused to believe him, and beat him with the end of their guns until the man's head was split open. They also used electricity from a battery to torture him and would only stop if the man would tell them information about the CNA. For the Chins that are unlucky, they will be confined and locked up in detention facilities. These facilities are inadequate and unsuitable for anyone to be detained in. When interviewed by the Human Rights Watch, former innocent prisoners gave detailed descriptions of the harsh conditions inside detention facilities and stated that they were overcrowded, unsanitary, and infested with insects. Furthermore, prisoners are only given gruel to eat and no water to drink, which gave some prisoners no choice but to drink the dirty toilet water.

Forced labor
Myanmar has been a part of the International Labour Organization (ILO) since 1948 and in 1955, it ratified the 1930 Forced Labour Convention (No.29). Article 1 of the Convention states that each member of the ILO which ratifies this Convention undertakes to suppress the use of forced labour in all its forms within the shortest possible period. As a member state of the ILO, Myanmar has an obligation to honour the provisions contained under the eight core Conventions outlined in the ILO, which includes prohibition of forced labour. The Convention on the Rights of the Child also protects children from economic exploitation or any labour that is likely to be harmful to the child's health or physical, mental, spiritual, moral or social development, or likely to interfere with the child's education. The Myanmar government properly responded to its obligations, and in 1999 it issued Legislative Order No. 1/99, which states that whoever unlawfully compels any person to labour against the will of that person shall be punished with imprisonment of either description for a term of one year, or with a fine, or both. In 2007, the Federation of Trade Unions of Burma (FTUB), which records and reports violations of forced labour in Myanmar collected approximately 3500 cases of forced labour mainly involving the Chins in Chin state. Despite the legal structures set in statute, the military government fails to enforce the law and continuously turns a blind eye to forced labour that the Chins still presently endure. In June 2006, the SPDC Minister of Information stated that the Tatmadaw were doing everything legally and that forced labour was never used.

Forty-four Chin people interviewed by Human Rights Watch gave statements that they experienced forced labour themselves, and another fifty-two reported they were forced to porter for the Tatmadaw. One of them remembered that the Tatmadaw would call him to work for months, building houses for the SPDC or erecting fences for the army camp. Nothing was provided for him and he had to bring his own tools and equipment. There was no payment, and if he did not show up to work, the Tatmadaw would beat him. Forced labour disrupts the livelihood of the workers and prevents them from doing their regular jobs to support their families. Another Chin woman told the HRW of times where she was forced to porter more than ten times for the Tatmadaw. She would do it for days on end and would have to carry thirty-kilogram bags for up to twenty miles at a time. If she did not keep up the pace with the Tatmadaw, they would beat her and the other porters too. One time, she even refused orders, but the Tatmadaw replied by saying "you are living under our authority. You have no choice. You must do what we say" and beat her again.

Research 
In 2011, there is a research project regarding the human rights violations and health in Chin state. The researchers use " multistaged household cluster" sample and heads of household are interviewed on the health status, access to health care, food insecurity, human rights violations such as forced labor and forced displacement during the last 12 months. In the research data that they state that in 618 households, there are 568 cases of people suffering any forced labor. In 597 households, there are 468 cases of people forcing to do build bridges, roads, and buildings. There are also 36 cases of household member being imprisoned or detained.

Universal Periodic Review of Myanmar
The Universal Periodic Review (UPR) on Myanmar had a section for the protection and promotion of human rights in Myanmar. It summarized that Myanmar provided legal provisions under section 348 of the Constitution of the Republic of the Union of Myanmar, concerning the guarantee of non-discrimination of any kind as to race, colour, sex, language, religion, political opinion, poverty, birth, or other status. It states that capital punishment is prescribed under the law to be imposed only for the most serious of crimes and to only be carried out pursuant to the final judgment of a competent court. Further, the UPR states that the Penal Code of Myanmar prohibits torture, degrading treatment, arbitrary arrest, and that arrest of anyone must be done in accordance with procedure established under law. Additionally, it states that Myanmar provides the right of peaceful assembly and freedom of association. The summary seems to be contradictory to the real-life experiences of the Chin people.

States such as the United States of America, Jordan, New Zealand, Poland, and others have made recommendations to Myanmar concerning its human rights violations. There were recommendations for Myanmar to improve human rights, address humanitarian needs of its people, and engage constructively with its international human rights obligations. Poland in particular expressed regret that, despite constitutional provisions, the Government continued to control and restrict activity of minorities. The U.S. has condemned its systematic human rights violations and noted that government critics were at risk of harassment, arbitrary arrest, torture and ill-treatment, and even extrajudicial killings. It expressed concern over the situation of ethnic minorities.

Diaspora

Global Chin diaspora 
Given their persecution in Burma, thousands of Chins are scattered throughout Europe, the United States, and Southeast Asia.  American Baptist, British, and Swedish Lutheran church groups have helped relocate thousands of Chin people.

Global Chin News, World News in Chin, World and Chin-Burmese News in Chin, Chin Cable Network, Chin News Channel, Chinland Today and Chin Articles and News, are some well known Chin media websites that broadcast daily news in Chin languages.

Chin refugees 
It is estimated that at least 60,000 Chin people refugees are living in India, while more than 20,000 Chin people refugees are living in Malaysia. Several thousands more are scattered in North America, Europe, Australia, and New Zealand.

The majority of Chin refugees entering the United States are Christians who are either young, single males, or young couples, some with children. Most are uneducated and come from small villages. Many Chin are pushed to leave by their parents for fear that they will be forced by the Burmese government to take part in dangerous or difficult jobs that range from road paving to human mine sweeping.  It has been documented that civilians forced to porter in Burma's conflict areas are sometimes sent before the troops so that they will detonate mines (Online Burma/Myanmar Library, 2010).

The Chin people who flee from Burma usually enter the United States directly from Thailand, Malaysia, and India. For most leaving Burma, the trip is illegal, dangerous, and expensive. Many of those who have little money fled through boats, cars, or walk. Other who have more money went through airplanes. There are brokers involved who charge approximately $1,000 per person to transport refugees across the border. If those fleeing are caught by either the Burmese government or the government of the country they are trying to enter, they face imprisonment that may include harsh treatment such as being beaten. Those in refugee camps (located mainly in Thailand) are told that it is easier to gain entry into the United States if they have children; thus, many young, new parents enter the United States and need jobs immediately in order to support their young families.

Mizoram response to Chins seeking refuge
Chins have restricted freedom of movement and their travel is limited by the SPDC which makes it difficult for them to escape persecution in Myanmar. They are left with no choice but to leave, without travel documents, to nearby states. Chins mainly travel to the Indian state of Mizoram and seek protection there. As of 2011, it is estimated that 100,000 Chins were living there. Initially, Mizoram welcomed the Chins. However, as the persecution worsened in Myanmar, the Mizoram population became less generous in terms of the protection it gave and its attitude towards Chins. However, this attitude has completely reversed beginning from the 21st Century, with people from both areas helping each other through disasters with a newfound realisation of shared identity.

Previously, though some could flee from persecution in Myanmar, they faced a new problem when arriving in Mizoram. There they do not have legal immigration status and are subsequently treated as illegal aliens. As such, the Chins that arrive at Mizoram are placed in a "protracted, urban refugee situation" which is defined by the United Nations High Commissioner for Refugees (UNHCR) as a situation where refugees find themselves in a long-standing and intractable state of limbo. Their lives may not be at risk but their basic rights and essential economic, social, and psychological needs remain unfulfilled after years of exile. They face challenges related to livelihood, food, shelter, and healthcare. For some refugees, survival may be more difficult when compared to their former lives in Myanmar.  Local integration is extremely challenging for Chins since they do not speak the local language and are not used to the regional culture and practices. Thus, many Chin live and do informal work on the outer margins of the community. As a result of not having any legal immigration status, many Chins have reported being arrested, detained, and fined for being foreigners. Some Chins are victims of labour exploitation and crime but do not report it to the police for fear of deportation.

The Young Mizo Association (YMA) is a voluntary association in Mizoram whose mandate is to provide community service, which includes "conservation of Mizo culture and heritage". In the past, it has issued orders forcing Chins to leave Mizoram because they do not want foreigners in their country. This breaches the international principle of non-refoulement because if Chins were to be sent back to Myanmar, persecution and suffering would be inevitable for them. One interviewee who spoke to the Human Rights Watch recalled that members of the YMA carried sticks and went to each of the Chins' houses to ensure that they left Mizoram. The police also arrested Chins who did not leave and confined them in jail.

The change in attitude of Mizoram is clearest during the 2021 Myanmar coup when the military overthrew the Myanmar government. Fearing persecution, more than ten thousand Chins fled to Mizoram. In stark contrast to previous years, the Mizoram government took them in and protected them despite of direct orders from the Indian government to prevent refugees from entering India. Mizoram Chief Minister Zoramthanga sent a letter to the Indian government stating:

This sentiment was shared throughout the state.  The Young Mizo Association built refugee towns and supplied the refugees with food, clothes and money donated by people from all over Mizoram. On the request of Young Mizo Association, Mizoram allocated money for the refugees, which included lawmakers and even the chief minister of Chin state, Salai Lian Luai.

Notable Chin people
Gokhothang was a powerful Guite prince from Mualpi, also known as Go Khaw Thang, Go Khua Thang, or Kokutung (the latter being the name used by the historians Carey and Tuck). He is the only Zomi prince whom the neighboring Meitei (Manipur) Kingdom ever acknowledged as Raja (or Ningthou in Metei language). His powerful dominion included over seventy cities, towns, and villages. He became known as the leader of all Zo people.
Pau Cin Hau was a prophet who lived around 1859. He created a script for the Zo people named Zo tuallai. He also founded the Laipan religion. This religion was very popular among the Zo people before the arrival of American missionaries.
Living around 1867, Khai Kam Suantak was a famous Chin leader. He ruled over the largest country in the Chin hills. Khai Kam College in Kalemyo was named in his honor, although it had since been renamed Kale College. 
Zoramthanga, was a boxer who won a bronze medal at the 1990 Bombay Boxing World Cup.
Taik Chun, a recipient of Aung San Thuriya medal, the highest and most prestigious award for gallantry and bravery.

Henry Van Thio, politician and vice-president of Burma.
Cheery Zahau is a Chin human rights activist, women's right activist, feminist, politician, writer, development and peace leader. She is the founder and leader of "Women's League of Chinland" and winner of UNDP's N-Peace Awards 2017.
Thet Mon Myint is Chin actress, one of the legendary actresses in the industry. She won two Myanmar Academy awards for best actress.
 Benjamin Sum, singer and Myanmar Idol season 4 runners up
 Esther Dawt Chin Sung, singer and winner of Myanmar Idol season 4

See also
 Chin Student Association

References

External links

Chin Cultural Profile
Chin Bible 
Zomi Re-unification Organisation
iChin National Front
English - Zomi/Chin Online dictionary
Human Rights Watch Report on Persecution of Chins
Report on Chin People Seeking Refuge in Mizoram 

Ethnic groups in Myanmar
Kuki tribes
Headhunting